Thelocactus leucacanthus is a species of cactus. It is endemic to Mexico.

Subspecies
Thelocactus leucacanthus schmollii (Werderm.) Mosco & Zanovello

References

leucacanthus
Flora of Mexico
Least concern plants